The Roman Catholic Diocese of La Paz en la Baja California Sur (erected 21 March 1988) is a suffragan diocese of the Archdiocese of Tijuana. It was a suffragan of the Archdiocese of Hermosillo until 25 November 2006.

Ordinaries
Prefecture Apostolic of La Paz en la Baja California Sur
Juan Giordani, F.S.C.J. (1958 -1972 ) 
Gilberto Valbuena Sánchez (1972 -1976 see below)

Vicariate Apostolic of La Paz en la Baja California Sur
Gilberto Valbuena Sánchez (see above 1976 -1988 see below)

Diocese of La Paz en la Baja California Sur
Gilberto Valbuena Sánchez (see above 1988 -1989), appointed Bishop of Colima
Braulio Rafael León Villegas (1990 -1999), appointed Bishop of Ciudad Guzmán, Jalisco
Miguel Ángel Alba Díaz (2001 - )

Episcopal See
La Paz, Baja California Sur

External links and references

Diócesis de La Paz Official Page.
Mexico Conference of Catholic Bishops. La Paz Page

La Paz en la Baja California Sur
La Paz
La Paz en la Baja California Sur, Roman Catholic Diocese of
La Paz en la Baja California Sur
La Paz en la Baja California Sur
1988 establishments in Mexico